John Forrest Floberg (October 28, 1915 – August 29, 2011) was the United States Assistant Secretary of the Navy (AIR) from 1949 to 1953.

Biography

Early life
Born in 1915, John F. Floberg was a lawyer. He also graduated from the United States armed forces' training course in atomic weapons at the Sandia National Laboratories at Kirtland Air Force Base outside Albuquerque, New Mexico.

Adult life
President of the United States Harry S. Truman named Floberg as Assistant Secretary of the Navy (AIR) in 1949, and Floberg held this office from December 5, 1949 through July 23, 1953. During this period, Floberg was a strong supporter of Admiral Hyman G. Rickover's proposals to create a nuclear navy; together, Floberg and Rickover eventually convinced Admiral William Fechteler, Chief of Naval Operations, to support the construction of atomic carriers.

In 1957, President Dwight D. Eisenhower appointed Floberg as one of five members of the United States Atomic Energy Commission, and Floberg served on that commission from October 1, 1957 until June 23, 1960.

In 1960, Floberg moved to Akron, Ohio to become General Counsel of the Firestone Tire and Rubber Company. He later became a vice president and a member of Firestone's executive committee.

References

External links
 

1915 births
United States Assistant Secretaries of the Navy
2011 deaths